This is a list of monuments in Bajhang District, Nepal as officially recognized by and available through the website of the Department of Archaeology, Nepal. 
Jalapa Devi Temple is one of the important cultural heritage of Bajhang district which is located in Rithapata V.D.C. of Dewal. Besides Jalapa Devi Temple, there is Masta Devi temple located in Jayaprithvinagar and Surmadevi temple in Chainpur which are also famous temples. Rana palaces and Hindu temples are the main attraction of this district.

List of monuments

|}

See also 
 List of monuments in Sudurpashchim Province
 List of monuments in Nepal

References 

Bajhang